Martine Bercher (February 23, 1944 – December 7, 2005) was an American football defensive back for the University of Arkansas Razorbacks football team from 1962-1966. He was a member of the 1964 National Championship team that won the 1965 Cotton Bowl Classic, and was named to the University of Arkansas All Century Team in 1994.

Arkansas
Bercher attended the University of Arkansas from 1962–1966, where he would become an All-American. Bercher played under Frank Broyles as a defensive back, and was a sophomore on the 1964 National Championship team.

NFL

Atlanta Falcons
Bercher was drafted in the sixth round with the 151st pick by the Atlanta Falcons in the 1967 NFL Draft. He was with the Falcons for only the 1967 NFL season.

Minnesota Vikings
Bercher became a member of the Minnesota Vikings for 1968. This would be the Fort Smith natives' final year of professional football.

After football
Catholic High School hired Bercher as a teacher and assistant football coach in 1969. He moved back to Fort Smith to care for his ill father-in-law in 1972. Bercher would re-open his father-in-law's restaurant and operate it for over 30 years until his death in 2005.

References

1944 births
2005 deaths
Sportspeople from Fort Smith, Arkansas
Players of American football from Arkansas
American football running backs
Arkansas Razorbacks football players